A variety of adzuki beans (Vigna angularis) that are black.

In Korean, they are called geomeunpat ("black adzuki beans"), geomjeongpat ("black adzuki beans"), heukdu ("black beans"), or heuksodu ("black small beans"). Gugeupbang eonhae, a 1466 medical book, mentions it using the name geomeunpɑt.

The skin is thinner than that of the usual red adzuki beans, thus it is often husked prior to cooking, which gave this cultivar the name geopipat ("dehulled adzuki beans"). White adzuki bean powder (geopipat-gomul) and white adzuki bean paste (geopipat-so) made from husked black adzuki beans are used in Korean rice cakes and confections.

Confusingly, the Japanese Okinawan kuroazuki ("black adzuki beans") are not adzuki beans, but black cowpeas (Vigna unguiculata).

References 

Edible legumes
Korean cuisine
Korean vegetables
Vigna